Kuusisto may refer to:

 Kuusisto (island), in Kaarina, Finland
 Kuusisto (surname)